Hardal (also spelled Chardal; , acronym for  , , plural ) usually refers to the portion of the Religious Zionist Jewish community in Israel which inclines significantly toward Haredi ideology (whether in terms of outlook on the secular world, or in their stringent khumra approach to Halakha).

Hardal Jews are also known as Torani (lit., "Torah-oriented") or Torani-Leumi.

Overview
On yeshiva.org.il, "Chardal" is described as, "The people who classify themselves as 'Charedi Leumi', or 'Chardal', try to keep the Mitzvot strictly, Kalah Kechamurah [light and weighty matters alike], while being involved in the national life in the state, and in the settling of Eretz Yisrael." It has also been explained as the "Anglo Orthodox religious sector who follow a Charedi lifestyle, yet may also serve in the army in religious units, attend a Hesder yeshiva, and pursue a work career". Yet another explanation is, "those connected to the seriousness of Torah learning and stricter observance of Jewish Law - like the Charedim - but who are Zionist and have a more positive view of the secular world and Israel, like the dati leumi camp".

The term Hardal is sometimes used to refer to those coming from the Haredi world who join Nahal Haredi (the shortened army service for Yeshiva graduates) and continue to live within the broader Hardal world. It is also sometimes used for American yeshivish Jews who moved to Israel and support the state.

History
The term Hardal is part of a broad process of certain groups of Religious Zionist youth becoming more strict in certain religious observances, and more ideologically driven by the thought of Zvi Yehuda Kook (son of Abraham Isaac Kook). In the late 1970s, graduates of Mercaz HaRav yeshiva began to reject certain aspects of the Religious Zionist and Bnei Akiva lifestyle.

According to some sources, the term Hardal was created at a meeting of the youth group EZRA in 1990. (Ezra is the Poalei Agudah youth group associated with Torah im Derech Eretz.) In later years, the term Hardal became a group that actually started separating itself from the broader religious Zionist community in order to dedicate itself to leading a life dedicated to strict Jewish practice, without the influence of outside culture. There was emphasis placed on modesty in dress, and early marriage. Shlomo Aviner was a major ideologue for this group.

In recent years, it refers to those under the influence of Zvi Thau, who left Yeshivat Merkaz HaRav to found the more Hardalic Yeshivat Har Hamor. Thau rejects secular studies and secular influences. He is also against any academic influence on teachers colleges, rejecting the influence of modern educational psychology, and modern approaches to the study of the Bible. Those who follow this approach are called followers of Yeshivat HaKav - "Yeshivot that follow the line".

Schools
There are schools for both boys and girls located in Jerusalem, as well as in Ramat Beit Shemesh (Ahavat Yisrael). Their philosophy is, "To adhere to an open Haredi approach to Halakha and lifestyle, while at the same time leaving the possibility for army service and university studies as a goal".

Leadership

Past leaders (deceased)
 Mordechai Eliyahu, former Chief Rabbi of Israel (1929–2010)
 Avraham Shapira, former Chief Rabbi of Israel, and dean of the Merkaz HaRav yeshiva (1914–2007)
 Zvi Yehuda Kook, former dean of the Mercaz HaRav yeshiva (1891–1982)
 Noah Weinberg, former dean of the Aish HaTorah yeshiva (1930–2009)
 Meir Kahane, former leader of Kach (1932–1990)
 Binyamin Ze'ev Kahane, former leader of Kahane Chai (1966–2000)
 Shaul Yisraeli, former rabbi of Kfar Haroeh and dean of the Mercaz HaRav yeshiva (1909–1995)
 Ya'akov Yosef, former dean of the Hazon Ya'akov yeshiva (1946–2013)
 Shimon Gershon Rosenberg, founder and former dean of the Siach Yitzchak yeshiva (1949–2007)
 Yeshayahu Hadari, former dean of the HaKotel yeshiva (1933–2018)

Current leaders:
 Bezalel Smotrich, member of the Knesset, leader of the Religious Zionist Party, and co-founder of Regavim
 Rafi Peretz, former Education Minister, and former leader of The Jewish Home
 Eli Yishai, leader of Yachad
 Avi Maoz, MK for Noam
 Eli Ben-Dahan, former Deputy Defense Minister and leader of Ahi
 Baruch Marzel, former leader of the Jewish National Front
 Ya'akov Katz, former leader of the National Union
 Binyamin Elon, former leader of Moledet
 Michael Ben-Ari, former chairman and spokesman for Otzma Yehudit
 Ben-Zion Gopstein, leader of Lehava
 Shalom Dov Wolpo, leader of Eretz Yisrael Shelanu and SOS Israel
 Yehuda Glick, leader of HALIBA and former Likud MK
 Hillel Horowitz, former Jewish Home MK
 David Bar-Hayim, head of the Machon Shilo Institute
 Yonatan Yosef, spokesman for Jewish settlers in Sheikh Jarrah
 Yaakov Ariel, rabbi of Ramat Gan
 Shmuel Eliyahu, rabbi of Safed
 Dov Lior, rabbi of Kiryat Arba
 Nachman Kahana, rabbi of Hazon Yichezkeil
 Zephaniah Drori, rabbi of Kiryat Shmona
 Yitzchak Sheilat, co-founder of Birkat Moshe yeshiva
 Zvi Thau, dean of the Har Hamor yeshiva and spiritual leader of Noam
 Nahum Rabinovitch, dean of the Birkat Moshe yeshiva
 Eliezer Waldman, dean of the Kiryat Arba yeshiva
 Haim Drukman, dean of the Or Etzion yeshiva
 Mordechai Elon, former dean of the HaKotel yeshiva
 Meir Mazuz, dean of the Kisse Rahamim yeshiva
 Zalman Melamed, dean of the Beit El yeshiva
 Eliezer Melamed, dean of the Har Bracha yeshiva
 Yitzhak Shapira, dean of the Od Yosef Chai yeshiva
 Shlomo Aviner, dean of the Ateret Yerushalayim yeshiva
 Yisrael Ariel, former rabbi of Yamit and founder of the Temple Institute
 Eli Sadan, founder and head of Bnei David Academy
 Daniella Weiss, former Mayor of Kedumim Village in Samaria
 Hillel Weiss, of "Professors for a Strong Israel"
 Oury Amos Cherki, senior lecturer at Machon Meir
 Robert Aumann, Nobel Prize winner and professor at the Hebrew University of Jerusalem

See also
 Orthodox Judaism
 Haredim and Zionism
 Modern Orthodox Judaism#Ideological spectrum

References

External links
Nefesh B'Nefesh: Choosing a School and its Religious Approach

 
History of Zionism
Neo-Zionism
Haredi Judaism
Haredi Zionism